Nana Irene Bryant (November 23, 1888 – December 24, 1955) was an American film, stage, and television actress. She appeared in more than 100 films between 1935 and 1955.

Biography
Bryant was born 1888 in Cincinnati, Ohio. She appeared in stock companies in Los Angeles and San Francisco, and spent several seasons on tour. She also played on Broadway, appearing in the then non-singing role of Morgan le Fay in Rodgers and Hart's A Connecticut Yankee in King Arthur's Court, before working in films. Her other Broadway credits included Marriage Is for Single People (1945), Baby Pompadour (1934), A Ship Comes In (1934), The First Apple (1933), The Dubarry (1932), The Stork is Dead (1932), Heigh-Ho, Everybody (1932), The Padre (1926), The Wild Rose (1926), No More Women (1926), The Firebrand (1924).

Bryant had a supporting role in the Frank Morgan Show, a summer replacement for Jack Benny's program in 1946.

On television, she played Connie's mother in The First Hundred Years and Mrs. Nestor in Our Miss Brooks. She also made several appearances as the mother of Margaret Williams  (Jean Hagen) during the first three seasons of Make Room for Daddy.

Bryant appeared for the first time in a musical role October 1 to November 1, 1912 in The Man Who Owns Broadway at Morosco's Burbank Theatre, produced by David M. Hartford. Her role was Sylvia, Anthony Bridwell's daughter. She sang Song of the Soul in Act 1 and I'm in love with one of the stars.  She was accompanied by Sophia Caldwell of Wheeling, West Virginia; Caldwell was then studying for the opera.

Personal life 
Bryant was married to writer Ted MacLean.

Bryant died in Hollywood, California in 1955, aged 67. She was buried in Valhalla Memorial Park Cemetery.

Partial filmography

 Unknown Woman (1935) - Aunt Mary
Atlantic Adventure (1935) - Joan Hill (uncredited)
A Feather in Her Hat (1935) - Lady Drake
Guard That Girl (1935) - Sarah
Crime and Punishment (1935) - Madam (uncredited)
One Way Ticket (1935) - Mrs. Bourne
The Lone Wolf Returns (1935) - Aunt Julie Stewart
You May Be Next (1936) - Miss Abbott
Lady of Secrets (1936) - Aunt Harriet
The King Steps Out (1936) - Louise
Meet Nero Wolfe (1936) - Sarah Barstow
Blackmailer (1936) - Mrs. Lindsay
The Man Who Lived Twice (1936) - Margaret Schuyler
Theodora Goes Wild (1936) - Ethel Stevenson
Pennies from Heaven (1936) - Miss Howard
Let's Get Married (1937) - Mrs. Willoughby
The League of Frightened Men (1937) - Agnes Burton
The Devil Is Driving (1937) - Mrs. Sanders
A Dangerous Adventure (1937) - Marie
Counsel for Crime (1937) - Mrs. Maddox
Man-Proof (1938) - Meg Swift
Midnight Intruder (1938) - Mrs. John Clark Reitter Sr.
The Adventures of Tom Sawyer (1938) - Mrs. Thatcher
Mad About Music (1938) - Louise Fusenot
Sinners in Paradise (1938) - Mrs. Franklin Sydney
Give Me a Sailor (1938) - Mrs. Minnie Brewster
Always in Trouble (1938) - Mrs. Minnie Darlington
Out West with the Hardys (1938) - Dora Northcote
Peck's Bad Boy with the Circus (1938) - Mrs. Henry Peck
Swing, Sister, Swing (1938) - Hyacinth Hepburn
Lincoln in the White House (1939, Short) - Mary Todd Lincoln (uncredited)
Street of Missing Men (1939) - Mrs. Putnam
 Parents on Trial (1939) - Margaret Ames
Espionage Agent (1939) - Mrs. Corvall
Our Neighbors – The Carters (1939) - Louise Wilcox
Brother Rat and a Baby (1940) - Mrs. Harper
If I Had My Way (1940) - Marian Johnson
A Little Bit of Heaven (1940) - Mom
Father Is a Prince (1940) - Susan Bower
The Reluctant Dragon (1941) - Mrs. Benchley
Nice Girl? (1941) - Mary Peasley
Thieves Fall Out (1941) - Martha Matthews
One Foot in Heaven (1941) - Mrs. Morris
Public Enemies (1941) - Emma
The Corsican Brothers (1941) - Madame Dupre
Calling Dr. Gillespie (1942) - Mrs. Marshall Todwell
Get Hep to Love (1942) - Aunt Addie
Youth on Parade (1942) - Agatha Frost
Thunder Birds (1942) - Mrs. Blake
Madame Spy (1942) - Alicia Rolf
Hangmen Also Die! (1943) - Mrs. Hellie Novotny
Get Going (1943) - Mrs. Daughtery
Best Foot Forward (1943) - Mrs. Dalrymple
The West Side Kid (1943) - Mrs. Winston
Princess O'Rourke (1943) - Mrs. Mulvaney (uncredited)
The Song of Bernadette (1943) - Mere Imbert (uncredited)
The Adventures of Mark Twain (1944) - Mrs. Langdon
Jungle Woman (1944) - Miss Gray - Nurse
Bathing Beauty (1944) - Dean Clinton
Take It or Leave It (1944) - Miss Burke
Marriage Is a Private Affair (1944) - Nurse
Can't Help Singing (1944) - Mrs. Carstairs (uncredited)
Brewster's Millions (1945) - Mrs. Gray
Week-End at the Waldorf (1945) - Mrs. H. Davenport Drew
Black Market Babies (1945) - Mrs. Grace Andrews
The Virginian (1946) - Mrs. Wood (uncredited)
The Runaround (1946) - Mrs. Mildred Hampton
Big Town (1946) - Mrs. Crane
The Perfect Marriage (1947) - Corinne Williams
Millie's Daughter (1947) - Mrs. Cooper Austin
The Big Fix (1947) - Mrs. Carter
Possessed (1947) - Pauline Graham (uncredited)
The Hal Roach Comedy Carnival (1947) - Mrs. Cornelius Belmont Sr., in 'Fabulous Joe'
The Fabulous Joe (1947) - Mrs. Belmont
The Unsuspected (1947) - Mrs. White
Her Husband's Affairs (1947) - Mrs. Winterbottom
Dangerous Years (1947) - Miss Templeton
Goodbye, Miss Turlock (1948, Short) - Miss Turlock (uncredited)
Reaching from Heaven (1948) - Kay Bradley
On Our Merry Way (1948) - Housekeeper (deleted sequence) (uncredited)
Stage Struck (1948) - Mrs. Howard
Eyes of Texas (1948) - Hattie Waters
 Lady at Midnight (1948) - Lydia Forsythe
Inner Sanctum (1948) - Mrs. Mitchell
The Return of October (1948) - Cousin Therese
The Kissing Bandit (1948) - Nun (uncredited)
Ladies of the Chorus (1948) - Mrs. Adele Carroll
State Department: File 649 (1949) - Peggy Brown
Hideout (1949) - Sybil Elwood Kaymeer
The Lady Gambles (1949) - Mrs. Dennis Sutherland
The Blonde Bandit (1950) - Mrs. Henley
Key to the City (1950) - Mrs. Cabot (uncredited)
I Was a Shoplifter (1950) - Aunt Clara (uncredited)
A Modern Marriage (1950) - Mrs. Brown
Three Secrets (1950) - Mrs. Gilwyn, Supervisor of 'The Shelter' (uncredited)
Let's Dance (1950) - Mrs. Bryant (uncredited)
Harvey (1950) - Mrs. Hazel Chumley
The Du Pont Story (1950) - Elizabeth du Pont
A Modern Marriage (1951)
Follow the Sun (1951) - Sister Beatrice
Only the Valiant (1951) - Mrs. Drumm
Bright Victory (1951) - Mrs. Claire Nevins
Geraldine (1953) - Dean Blake
About Mrs. Leslie (1954) - Mrs. McKay
The Outcast (aka The Fortune Hunter) (1954) - Mrs. Banner
The Private War of Major Benson (1955) - Mother Redempta

References

External links

Nana Bryant papers, 1917-1955, held by the Billy Rose Theatre Division, New York Public Library for the Performing Arts

1888 births
1955 deaths
Burials at Valhalla Memorial Park Cemetery
American film actresses
Actresses from Ohio
American stage actresses
20th-century American actresses
American television actresses